Badrul Hisham Shaharin (born 23 September 1978), better known as Chegubard, is a Malaysian activist and politician. He was a member of People's Justice Party (PKR) in the Pakatan Rakyat (PR) coalition. He is also the chief of Solidariti Anak Muda Malaysia (SAMM), a prominent Malaysian youth NGO.

Badrul Hisham contested the state seat of Rantau in Negeri Sembilan during the 2004 general election against the incumbent Menteri Besar then, Mohamad Hasan but was defeated. In the 2008 general election, he contested the Rembau parliamentary seat in Negeri Sembilan against UMNO youth leader, Khairy Jamaluddin but was subsequently defeated too. He contested the Sungai Acheh state seat in Penang in the 2013 general election and lost again.

In August 2016, PKR has sacked Badrul Hisham for damaging the image of the party and causing divisions among the members by defying party's orders.

Election results

References

External links 
 
 

Malaysian people of Malay descent
Malaysian Muslims
Former People's Justice Party (Malaysia) politicians
Living people
1978 births
People from Negeri Sembilan